Bulgarian Rhapsody is a 2014 Bulgarian drama film directed by Ivan Nitchev. It was selected as the Bulgarian entry for the Best Foreign Language Film at the 87th Academy Awards, but was not nominated. There was some controversy in the selection due to Nitchev's involvement with the Bulgarian National Film Council.

The film is part of a historic trilogy about Bulgarian Judaism, which consists of the films: After the End of the World (1999) and The Journey to Jerusalem (2003).

Cast
 Stefan Popov as Giogio
 Kristiyan Makarov as Moni
 Anjela Nedyalkova as Shelli
 Moni Moshonov as Moiz
 Stoyan Aleksiev as Abraham
 Alex Ansky as Albert
 Tatyana Lolova as Fortune
 Dimitar Ratchkov as Ivan Georgiev

See also
 List of submissions to the 87th Academy Awards for Best Foreign Language Film
 List of Bulgarian submissions for the Academy Award for Best Foreign Language Film

References

External links
 

2014 films
2014 drama films
Bulgarian drama films
2010s Bulgarian-language films
Films directed by Ivan Nitchev